Beard–Kerr Farm is a historic home and farm located in Georgetown Township, Floyd County, Indiana.  The farmhouse was built about 1827, and is a two-story, Greek Revival style brick I-house. It has a one-story brick extension with a low-pitched saltbox roof and front porch. Also on the property are the contributing wood-frame summer kitchen, livestock barn, garage, privy, and corn crib.

It was listed on the National Register of Historic Places in 2012.

References

Farms on the National Register of Historic Places in Indiana
Greek Revival houses in Indiana
Houses completed in 1827
Houses in Floyd County, Indiana
National Register of Historic Places in Floyd County, Indiana
1827 establishments in Indiana